The French Medical Institute for Mothers and Children (FMIC) is a hospital in Kabul, Afghanistan, established in 2006 through a unique partnership between the government of France and Government of Islamic Republic of Afghanistan. The institute claims to have implemented eHealth solutions including tele-consultations. 

FMIC offers a wide array of services including inpatient care, clinical consultations, diagnostic services, eHealth, 24/7 pharmacy services, and advanced surgeries, neurology, adult cardiac care with a catheterization lab, cardiac surgery, orthopedics, ENT, ophthalmology, obstetric and gynecology, physiotherapy, vision and dental care.

In 2006, FMIC conducted the first open-heart pediatric cardiac surgery in Afghanistan of a 13-year-old girl. In 2012, construction at FMIC began on a new 52 bed wing for obstetric and gynecologic care and a 14-bed neonatal intensive care unit.

FMIC claims to be ISO 9001:2008 accredited, and was the first medical center to receive this accreditation in 2009 as per its official web site.

References

Children's hospitals in Afghanistan
Hospitals in Kabul
Child-related organisations in Afghanistan
2005 establishments in Afghanistan
Hospitals established in 2005